The rivière du Canot is a stream flowing in the territory of La Tuque, in the administrative region of Mauricie, and will drain into the Gatineau River in the unorganized territory of Lac-De La Bidière, in the Antoine-Labelle Regional County Municipality, in the administrative region of Laurentides, in Quebec, in Canada.

Geography 

The hydrographic slopes neighboring the Canot river are:
 north side: La Choquette, Brossard Lake;
 east side: rivière aux Bleuets;
 south side: Gatineau River;
 west side: Choquette River.

Lac du Canot (length:  in an east-west direction;) is the main head water body of the Rivière du Canot.

In its upper part, the Canot river flows to the southwest, more or less in parallel (on the west side) with the rivière aux Bleuets.

Toponymy 
The canoe is a generally light, multi-purpose boat that has been widely used to navigate rivers in American history. The characteristics of the canoe make it useful especially for portages, shelter by forming a tent and especially navigate in shallow waters. The explorers of this region referred to this means of river transport to designate this river.

The toponym Rivière du Canot was formalized on December 5, 1968 at the Place Names Bank of the Commission de toponymie du Québec.

See also 

 La Tuque, a city
 Antoine-Labelle Regional County Municipality
 Gatineau River, a stream
 Rivière aux Bleuets (Bazin River), a stream
 Choquette River, a stream
 List of rivers of Quebec

Notes and references 

Rivers of Laurentides
Rivers of Mauricie
Antoine-Labelle Regional County Municipality
La Tuque, Quebec